Life of a Flower is a 1953 Vietnamese 16mm romance film directed by Trần Viết Long in his art name Trần Lang.

Plot

Production
Life of a Flower was the first sound film which Vietnamese men has produced. Location is Hanoi (84th Nguyen Du Street) and Hong Kong in 1953.

Art
 Studio : Kim Chung Films (Kim-Chung Điện-ảnh Công-ti)
 Director : Claude Bernard
 Producer and writer : Trần Viết Long (Manager Long)
 Camera : Raymond Chao

Music
 My village (Chung Quân)
 Echoes of memories (Nguyễn Văn Tý), singing by Kim Chung and Kim Xuân
 Autumn rain drops (Đặng Thế Phong)
 The guitar left behind (Phạm Duy)

Cast

 Kim Chung ... Ngọc Lan
 Kim Xuân ... Ngọc Thủy
 Trần Quang Tứ ... Thiện
 Ngọc Toàn ... Nhạc
 Tuấn Sửu ... Tam
 Nhã Ái ... Lan and Thủy's mother
 Tiền Phong ... Thiện's father
 Tiêu Lang ... A man buys cigarettes

with others actors from Kim Chung Performing Arts (Đoàn Cải-lương Kim-Chung).

See also
 Waterloo Bridge (1940 film)

References

External links
 
 Kim Chung Performing Arts enlightened the history of Vietnamese cinema - Vietnamese Cailuong // Sunday, 18 November 2005, 06:13 (GMT+7)
 Some feelings of the Life of a Flower - Short News Online // Sunday, 7 December 2008, 00:00 (GMT+7)
 Re-release the Life of a Flower - Hanoi Grapevine // Friday, 1 October 2010, 00:00 (GMT+7)
 Surprise by the beauties and voices of two Vietnamese actresses 63 years ago - BaoBinhLuan // Friday, 9 February 2018, 09:04 (GMT+7)

Vietnamese musical films
Vietnamese romance films
Films based on works by Vietnamese writers
1953 films
1950s romantic musical films
Vietnamese black-and-white films